The World Group Play-offs were four ties which involved the losing nations of the World Group first round and the winning nations of the World Group II. Nations that won their play-off ties entered the 2009 World Group, while losing nations joined the 2009 World Group II.

Israel vs. Czech Republic

Argentina vs. Germany

Japan vs. France

Italy vs. Ukraine

References

See also
Fed Cup structure

World Group Play-offs